Bressanvido is a town in the province of Vicenza, Veneto, Italy. SP51 goes through it.

Sources

Cities and towns in Veneto